The Duchy of Lower Lotharingia, also called Northern Lotharingia, Lower Lorraine or Northern Lorraine (and also referred to as Lothier or Lottier in titles), was a stem duchy established in 959, of the medieval Kingdom of Germany, which encompassed almost all of the modern Netherlands (the region of Frisia was loosely associated with the duchy, but the dukes exercised no de facto control over the territory), central and eastern Belgium, Luxemburg, the northern part of the German Rhineland province and the eastern parts of France's Nord-Pas de Calais region.

History
It was created out of the former Middle Frankish realm of Lotharingia under King Lothair II, that had been established in 855. Lotharingia was divided for much of the later ninth century, reunited under Louis the Younger by the 880 Treaty of Ribemont and upon the death of East Frankish king Louis the Child in 911 it joined West Francia under King Charles the Simple. It then formed a duchy in its own right, and about 925 Duke Gilbert declared homage to the German king Henry the Fowler, an act which King Rudolph of France was helpless to revert. From that time on Lotharingia (or Lorraine) remained a German stem duchy, the border with France did not change throughout the Middle Ages.

In 959 King Henry's son Duke Bruno the Great divided Lotharingia into two duchies: Lower and Upper Lorraine (or Lower and Upper Lotharingia) and granted Count Godfrey I of Mons (Hainaut) the title of a Duke of Lower Lorraine. Godfrey's lands were to the north (lower down the Rhine river system), while Upper Lorraine was to the south (further up the river system).  Both duchies formed the western part of the Holy Roman Empire established by Bruno's elder brother Emperor Otto I in 962.

Both Lotharingian duchies took very separate paths thereafter: Upon the death of Godfrey's son Duke Richar, Lower Lotharingia was directly ruled by the Emperor, until in 977 Otto II enfeoffed Charles, the exiled younger brother of King Lothair of France. Lower and Upper Lorraine were once again briefly reunited under Gothelo I from 1033 to 1044. After that, the Lower duchy was quickly marginalised, while Upper Lorraine came to be known as simply the Duchy of Lorraine.

Over the next decades the significance of the Duchy of Lower Lotharingia diminished and furthermore was affected by the conflict between Emperor Henry IV and his son Henry V: In 1100 Henry IV had enfeoffed Count Henry of Limburg, who Henry V, having enforced the abdication of his father, immediately deposed and replaced by Count Godfrey of Louvain. Upon the death of Duke Godfrey III in 1190, his son Duke Henry I of Brabant inherited the ducal title by order of Emperor Henry VI at the Diet of Schwäbisch Hall. Thereby the Duchy of Lower Lotharingia finally lost its territorial authority, while the remnant Imperial fief held by the Dukes of Brabant was later called the Duchy of Lothier (or Lothryk).

Successor states
After the territorial power of the duchy was shattered, many fiefdoms came to independence in its area. The most important ones of these were:

Archbishopric of Cologne
Prince-Bishopric of Liège
Bishopric of Utrecht
Bishopric of Cambrai   
Duchy of Limburg
County of Guelders (includes also the shire Teisterbant)
Margravate of Ename, later called Imperial Flanders or the County of Aalst 
County of Jülich
County of Namur
County of Cleves
County of Hainault, including the Margravate of Valenciennes and the County of Bergen
County of Holland
County of Berg
County of Loon
County of Horne

The following successor states remained under the authority of the titular dukes of Lower Lotharingia (Lothier):
Margraviate of Antwerp
County of Leuven and Brussels
Duchy of Brabant

See also
List of rulers of Lorraine

References 

History of the Low Countries
House of Lorraine
Former polities in the Netherlands
Duchies of the Holy Roman Empire
States and territories established in the 950s
States and territories established in the 970s
States and territories disestablished in the 1190s
959 establishments
10th-century establishments in Europe
1190s disestablishments in Europe